The Currency and Bank Notes Act 1928 (18 & 19 Geo. V c.13) is an Act of the Parliament of the United Kingdom relating to banknotes. Among other things, it makes it a criminal offence to deface a banknote.

Notes

External links

 

United Kingdom Acts of Parliament 1928
Bank of England
Criminal law of the United Kingdom
Banknotes of the United Kingdom